Mary Raleigh Richardson (1882/3 – 7 November 1961) was a Canadian suffragette active in the women's suffrage movement in the United Kingdom, an arsonist, a socialist parliamentary candidate and later head of the women's section of the British Union of Fascists (BUF) led by Sir Oswald Mosley.

Life
She grew up in Belleville, Ontario, Canada.
In 1898, she travelled to Paris and Italy. 
She lived in Bloomsbury, and witnessed Black Friday.

Richardson was a noted writer who published a novel, Matilda and Marcus (1915), and three volumes of poetry, Symbol Songs (1916), Wilderness Love Songs (1917), and Cornish Headlands (1920).

Richardson's Militant actions 

At the beginning of the 20th century, the suffragette movement, frustrated by a failure to achieve equal voting rights for women, began adopting increasingly militant tactics. In particular, the Women's Social and Political Union (WSPU), led by the charismatic Emmeline Pankhurst, frequently endorsed the use of property destruction to bring attention to the issue of women's suffrage. Richardson was a devoted supporter of Pankhurst and a member of the WSPU. Richardson joined Helen Craggs at the Women's Press shop and told her of the abuse from men (obscene remarks) and customers tearing up materials.

Richardson claimed to be at the Epsom races on Derby Day, 4 June 1913, when Emily Davison jumped in front of the King's horse. Emily Davison died in Epsom Cottage Hospital; Mary Richardson was reportedly chased and beaten by an angry mob but was given refuge in Epsom Downs station by a railway porter.

She committed a number of acts of arson, smashed windows at the Home Office and bombed a railway station. She was arrested nine times, receiving prison terms totalling more than three years. She was one of the first two women force-fed and released to recover and be re-arrested under the 1913 Cat and Mouse Act, Prisoners (Temporary Discharge for Ill Health) Act 1913, serving her sentences in HM Prison Holloway.

Richardson had been given the Hunger Strike Medal 'for Valour' by WSPU.

Richardson would recover at the cottage of Lillian Dove-Willcox in the Wye valley. She was devoted to Dove-Willcox and wrote poetry about her love for her.

Damaging the Rokeby Venus 

An act of defiance by Richardson occurred on 10 March 1914 when she entered the National Gallery in London to attack a painting by Velázquez, the Rokeby Venus, using a chopper she smuggled into the gallery. She wrote a brief statement explaining her actions to the WSPU which was published by the press:

As a fascist 

In 1932, after forming the belief that fascism was the "only path to a 'Greater Britain,'" Richardson joined the British Union of Fascists (BUF), led by Sir Oswald Mosley. She claimed that "I was first attracted to the Blackshirts because I saw in them the courage, the action, the loyalty, the gift of service and the ability to serve which I had known in the suffragette movement". Richardson rose quickly through the BUF ranks and by 1934 was Chief Organiser for the Women's Section of the party. She left within two years after becoming disillusioned with the sincerity of its policy on women.

Two other prominent suffragette leaders to gain high office in the BUF were Norah Elam and Commandant Mary Sophia Allen.

Later life 
In 1930, she adopted a young baby boy, named Roger Robert, whom she gave the name Richardson. 
Richardson published her autobiography, Laugh a Defiance, in 1953. 
She died at her flat in Hastings on 7 November 1961.

See also
Suffragette bombing and arson campaign
List of suffragists and suffragettes

References

Notes

Citations

Sources

Further reading

 Nead, Lynda. The Female Nude: Art, Obscenity, and Sexuality. Routledge, 1992. 
 Prater, Andreas. Venus at Her Mirror: Velázquez and the Art of Nude Painting. Prestel, 2002. 
 Bostridge, Mark. The Fateful Year. England 1914. Viking, 2014. Chapter on 'The Slashing of the Rokeby Venus'.

1880s births
1961 deaths
British fascists
Canadian fascists
British suffragists
Canadian suffragists
Canadian arsonists
British arsonists
Canadian feminists
British feminists
British women in politics
British anti-communists
British Union of Fascists politicians
Labour Party (UK) parliamentary candidates
British autobiographers
Canadian autobiographers
Canadian emigrants to the United Kingdom
Hunger Strike Medal recipients